Paolo Buso (born 28 July 1986) is an Italian rugby player. He currently plays for Zebre.

Career
After joining Calvisano at age 17 in 2003,  Buso made the first team in 2006, and scored 30 points in 14 league matches in one season.

During the 2008 Six Nations Championship Coach Nick Mallett selected Buso in the senior squad where he appeared in the Cardiff match against Wales.

In the summer of 2009 he left Calvisano to play for Rugby Roma. In May 2010 he joined Aironi in the Celtic League.

External links
scrum.com

1986 births
Living people
Sportspeople from Treviso
Italian rugby union players
Italy international rugby union players
Rugby Calvisano players
Zebre Parma players
Rugby union fullbacks